Jurijus is a Lithuanian masculine given name. Notable people with the name include:

 Jurijus Kadamovas (born 1966), immigrant to the United States (from Lithuania)
 Jurijus Veklenko (born 1990), Lithuanian singer

Lithuanian masculine given names